Generalstabsarzt and Admiralstabsarzt are in German armed forces the rank designations of the second highest grad of the generals rank group.

Germany

Bundeswehr
Generalstabsarzt and Admiralstabsarzt are the second highest general ranks of the Joint Medical Service or the military medical area of the Bundeswehr.

Normally the Bundeswehr Surgeon General of the medical service (de: Inspekteur des Sanitätsdienstes) might be assigned.

Equivalent to that two-star ranks (NATO-Rangcode OF-7) are Generalmajor (en: Major general) of the German Army or German Air Force, and the Konteradmiral (en: Rear admiral) of the German Navy.

Address
The manner of formal addressing of military surgeons with the rank Generalarzt (OF6, one-star), Generalstabsarzt (OF7, two stars) or Generaloberstabsarzt is, „Herr/Frau Generalarzt“. At the other hand, military surgeons with the rank Admiralarzt (OF6, one-star), Admiralstabsarzt (OF7, two stars) or Admiraloberstabsarzt is, „Herr/Frau Admiralarzt“.

Rank insignias
On the shoulder straps (Heer, Luftwaffe) there are two golden stars in golden oak leaves and the career insignia (de: Laufbahnabzeichen) as symbol of the medical standing, or course of studies. Regarding the Marine, the career insignia is in the middle of both sleeves, tree cm above the cuff strips, and on the shoulder straps between strips and button.

History

Wehrmacht 1933 – 1945
Generalstabsarzt of the Wehrmacht was comparable to the Generalleutnant (OF-7, two stars), as well as to the Gruppenführer and Generalleunant of the Waffen-SS.

In line to the so-called Reichsbesoldungsordnung (en: Reich's salary order), appendixes to the Salary law of the German Empire (de: Besoldungsgesetz des Deutschen Reiches) of 1927 (changes 1937 – 1940), the comparative ranks were as follows: C 2

Generalleutnant (Heer and Luftwaffe)
Vizeadmiral (Kriegsmarine)
Generalstabsarzt, from 1934 (medical service of the Wehrmacht)
Generalstabsveterinär, from 1934 (veterinarian service of the Wehrmacht)

Comparative military ranks 

See also main article Ranks and insignia of the German Army (1935–1945)

Kriegsmarine 
Rank designations of the Kriegsmarine as to Match 30, 1934, are contained in the table below.

Germany before 1933

In Prussia and Bavaria Generalstabsarzt der Armee (en: Surgeon General of the Army) was an appointment and the official title of the Chief of the entire military medical service. Officers, assigned to that particular staff position, could rise in ranks op to Generalleutnant (OF7).

In the first instance the Generalstabsarzt of the Prussian Army could be promoted to the Oberst OF5-rank. Since 1856 he could rise to Generalmajor, and since 1873 to Generalleutnant. At the same time the Generalstabsarzt was Chief of the Medical department of the Prussian Ministry of War, and Chief of the Medical corps. He was also superior to the Generalarzt.

Equivalent authority, mandate and competence was with the Generalstabsarzt of the Imperial German Navy. He was also Chief of the Medical division in the German Imperial Naval Office, and Chief of the Navy's Medical corps.

Austria-Hungary

In the Austria-Hungarian Heer there were two regular Generalstabsarzt staff positions established. One Generalstabsarzt was Chie of the Medical division of the Reichskriegsministerium and Chief of the military surgeon officer corps. The second Generalstabsarzt was Praeses of the Military medical committee. That particular rank was comparable to the Generalmajor OF6-rank (Major general).

In some cases a Surgen General of a Generalkommando (en: Army corps or Corps — XXX —) could be promoted to the rank of Generalstabsarzt.

Officers with that rank
Johann Traugott Dreyer von der Iller (1804-1871),  k. k. Generalstabsarzt
Felix von Kraus (1805-1875),   r. med., Generalstabsarzt und Sanitätsreferent
Partnon, Generalstabsarzt

Relevant literature
 Neumann, Alexander: Arzttum ist immer Kämpfertum - Die Heeressanitätsinspektion und das Amt "Chef des Wehrmachtsanitätswesens" im Zweiten Weltkrieg (1939-1945), 2005. 
 Süß, Winfried: Der "Völkskörper" im Krieg: Gesundheitspolitik, Gesundheitsverhältnisse und Krankenmord im nationalsozialistischen Deutschland 1939-1945'', 2003.

References

Military ranks of Germany
Military ranks of Austria
Austro-Hungarian Army
Two-star officers of the Bundeswehr
Two-star officers of Nazi Germany

sl:Generalstabsarzt